The original Croydon Cricket Club, based at Croydon (then part of Surrey), was prominent in the 18th century and played most of its matches at Duppas Hill. The earliest record of the club is in the 1707 season when it played two major matches against London.

Croydon had a very strong team in the 1731 season, beating London four times.

Croydon continued to be prominent through the 1730s but was less so in the 1740s and the club was barely mentioned again after that except in a few minor matches. It is believed to have disbanded in the later part of the 18th century and there is no modern equivalent.

In 2018, A club previously named Croydon Cricket Club of India (CCCI) got re-branded to Croydon Cricket Club (CCC) aiming to unite cricket played in across Croydon. It is not affiliated to the original Croydon Cricket Club.

The club home ground is Croygas which is located in Mollison Drive, Wallington.

Club has five senior cricket teams, four playing on Saturday and one on Sunday and a junior section.

The club participates in the following leagues in Surrey : 
Saturday:  Surrey Cricket League (SCL) and Fullers Brewery Surrey County League ( FBSCL)
Sunday:  Elite premier cricket league

References

Former senior cricket clubs
English cricket teams in the 18th century
Sports clubs established in the 1700s
English club cricket teams
Sport in the London Borough of Croydon
Cricket in London
Cricket in Surrey